Springwood is a suburb in the City of Logan, Queensland, Australia.

Geography

The size of Springwood is approximately 6 km². It has 17 parks covering nearly 9% of the total area.  The population of Springwood in 1996 was 9,738 people.  By 2001 the population was 9,084 showing a population decline of 7% in the area during that time. A high proportion of people in Springwood are in the baby boomers generation compared to population proportions in the surrounding local government area.

Springwood is a significant activity centre in the region, with a major bus station, two hotels, a 24-hour McDonald's, two state primary schools, a state high school, a campus of Calvary Christian College, a public library, three shopping malls, ambulance, fire and police stations and many places of worship (including Church of Christ, Uniting and Seventh-day Adventist churches).

Most commercial activity in Springwood is centred on the "town centre" in the north-west of the suburb along the Pacific Motorway. An increasing amount of commercial development is also occurring in the south-eastern parts of Springwood, an area unofficially known as Chatswood Hills. The remainder of the suburb is primarily middle-class residential areas.

History
Springwood is situated in the Yugarabul traditional Aboriginal country of the Brisbane and surrounding regions. Indigenous Australian people from the Yugambeh and Jaggera language groups inhabited the local area.

Springwood was laid out as a development when the South East Freeway to Brisbane was planned, at one end of the proposed Freeway. This was expected to be finished in 1972, but was not finished until 1985. The development was named after the name of the property owned by Brigader Sam Langford in 1932.

Springwood State High School opened on 24 January 1977.

Dennis Road State School opened on 24 January 1977, but just after the official opening, it was renamed Springwood Central State School.

Chatswood Hills State School opened on 24 January 1983.

Calvary Christian College opened on 23 January 1984.

Until September 2006, Springwood was home to an IKEA store, before moving to a new location in Slacks Creek, directly across the Pacific Motorway from Chatswood Hills.

From the 2000s, both the Queensland government and Logan City Council proposed that Springwood be redeveloped as a Principal Activity Centre (PAC). This was initially noted by the Queensland government in a 2005 paper, South East Queensland Regional Plan. The paper, in addition to its follow-up paper in 2009, cites multiple reasons for developing a PAC in Springwood: the area's close proximity to the Pacific Motorway, its strategic location between Brisbane City and the Gold Coast, existing urban infrastructure and availability of affordable housing. The aim of the proposal is to reduce growth pressures in established PACs whilst encouraging more employment opportunities and economic growth in South East Queensland.

In October 2009, Logan City Council partnered with GHD to create a master plan for redeveloping Springwood as a PAC. This plan was made after consultations with key stakeholders and residents in the local area. Using the South East Queensland Regional Plan as a foundation, the master plan envisions a future for Springwood in the year 2031 and beyond. The plan proposes a significant change in form and function of the suburb compared to its current state. As a suburb with a significant presence in automotive retail showrooms, the plan encourages these showrooms to consolidate around Compton Road and the Logan Mega Centre. The plan proposes new low-rise office spaces, residential apartments, recreational spaces, retail and commercial spaces to be developed within close distance to Springwood bus station. Moreover, the plan outlines two new town squares, a new road intersecting Dennis Road and Carol Avenue, a theatre, an art gallery, rehabilitation of Slacks Creek and an upgrade to public transport facilities. These proposals offer a framework for future planning scheme amendments made by Logan City Council.

Springwood Summit was held in October 2016 to jumpstart further public interest and discussion of the suburb. The summit had the tagline: "The start of SEQ's next CBD". More than 200 delegates from around the world attended the summit.

Logan City Council's Local Government Infrastructure Plan (LGIP) planned for land acquisition of two local state schools for new parks and town square between 2019 and 2021.

Demographics
Of these 49.1% were male and 50.9% were female. Aboriginal and/or Torres Strait Islander people made up 1.6% of the population. The median age remained unchanged at 37 years.  63.5% of people were born in Australia. The most common countries of birth were New Zealand 8.4%, England 4.1%, India 1.6%, China (excludes SARs and Taiwan) 1.2% and Philippines 1.0%. In Springwood, 79.4% of people only spoke English at home. Other languages spoken at home included Mandarin 1.4%, Korean 1.0%, Cantonese 0.9%, Romanian 0.6% and Punjabi 0.6%.

Demographics

Education 
Springwood Central State School is a government primary (Early Childhood-6) school for boys and girls at 26–34 Dennis Road. In 2018, the school had an enrolment of 312 students with 27 teachers (24 full-time equivalent) and 20 non-teaching staff (13 full-time equivalent). It includes a special education program.

Chatswood Hills State School is a government primary (Prep-6) school for boys and girls at Raleigh Street. In 2018, the school had an enrolment of 617 students with 49 teachers (41 full-time equivalent) and 31 non-teaching staff (19 full-time equivalent). It includes a special education program.

Calvary Christian College is a private primary (Prep-6) school for boys and girls at 161 Dennis Road. In 2018, the school had an enrolment of 934 students with 82 teachers (70 full-time equivalent) and 117 non-teaching staff (60 full-time equivalent).

Springwood State High School is a government secondary (7–12) school for boys and girls at 202 Springwood Road. In 2018, the school had an enrolment of 649 students with 66 teachers (62 full-time equivalent) and 37 non-teaching staff (25 full-time equivalent). It includes a special education program.

Notable people
 Huan Fraser, politician

References

External links